The  is a railway line in Tokushima Prefecture, Japan, owned and operated by Shikoku Railway Company (JR Shikoku). The Tokushima Line connects Sako Station in Tokushima and Tsukuda Station in Miyoshi from west to east in central Tokushima Prefecture. In addition to linking Tokushima and Kōchi prefectures, the line's eastern half serves the city of Tokushima as a commuter line.

Services
This is to allow for more efficient connecting service to the Dosan Line at Tsukuda.

The Tsurugisan limited express provides the bulk of express services on the line from Awa-Ikeda (on the Dosan Line) and Anabuki to Tokushima and Kaifu (on the Mugi Line).

There are two to three local trains per hour, with most trains serving the Tokushima – Awa-Ikeda, Tokushima – Anabuki, and Tokushima – Awa-Kawashima sections. Some trains continue through to the Mugi Line via Tokushima. Local trains are generally driver-only operated, but some daytime and late-night trains between Tokushima and Anabuki, as well as three trains between Anabuki and Awa-Ikeda, often have a conductor on board. Due to the length of platforms, train lengths are limited to a maximum of four cars.

The Tokushima Line serves as a bypass route between Tokushima and Kōchi; in the past, the Asa and Yoshinogawa express and some Tsurugisan limited express services connected the two cities (now passengers must change at Awa-Ikeda to the Nanpū limited express).

Station list 
 All stations are located in Tokushima Prefecture.
 Local trains stop at all stations. For details of the Tsurugisan and Muroto limited express services, see the respective articles.
 Trains can pass one another at stations marked "◇" and cannot pass at those marked "｜".

*: Although the official start of the Naruto Line is at Ikenotani, most trains travel through on the Kōtoku Line to Tokushima.

History
In 1907, the Tokushima Railway was nationalised under the Railway Nationalization Act.

The line was extended to Awa-Ikeda in 1914, connecting to the Dosan Line, and further extended to Minawa in 1931, which at the time was classed as an extension of the Tokushima line. In 1935 the section was incorporated into the Dosan Line.

Freight service on the line ceased in 1986.

See also
List of railway lines in Japan

References
This article incorporates material from the corresponding article in the Japanese Wikipedia

External links

 JR Shikoku official website 

Lines of Shikoku Railway Company
Rail transport in Tokushima Prefecture
Railway lines opened in 1899
1067 mm gauge railways in Japan
1899 establishments in Japan